A cask is a type of wooden container.

Cask or CASK may also refer to:
 CASK, a gene
 The Cask, 1920 novel by Freeman Wills Crofts

People
 Cask, a name; notable people with the name include:
 Jason Cask (born 1971), Australian tennis player
 Cask J. Thomson, Scottish musician and author

See also 
 Kask (disambiguation)
 Casque (disambiguation)
 CASC (disambiguation)
 KASC (disambiguation)